El camino de Xico (released internationally as Xico's Journey) is a 2020 Mexican 2D animated film by Eric D. Cabello Diaz in his directorial debut. The film features a wide ensemble voice cast of various Mexican actors led by Pablo Gama Iturrarán, Verónica Alva, and Luis Angel Jaramillo. Produced by Ánima, it was released in theaters on 12 November 2020 in Mexico.

Outside Mexico, Netflix acquired worldwide rights to the film and was released globally on 12 February 2021 on the streaming service.

Voice cast

Spanish
 Pablo Gama Iturrarán as Xico
 Verónica Alva as Copi
 Luis Angel Jaramillo as Gus
 Verónica Castro as Carmen
 Lila Downs as Nana Petra
 Randy Ebright as Señor Caradura
 Enrique Guzmán as Don Viejo
 Daniel Habif as Don Manuel
 Alex Lora as Tlacuache
 Carla Medina as Lupita
 Elena Poniatowska as Cuca
 José Miguel Pérez-Porrúa Suárez as Previer
 Marco Antonio Solís as Tochtli
 Víctor Trujillo as Venado Azul

English
 Adan Rocha as Xico
 Lola Raie as Copi
 Diego Olmedo as Gus
 Tonantzin Carmelo as Carmen
 Anita Ortega as Nana Petra
 Miguel Perez as Señor Caradura
 Ruben Garfias as Don Viejo
 Anthony L. Fernandez as Don Manuel
 Dino Andrade as Tlacuache
 Roxana Ortega as Lupita
 Norma Maldonado as Cuca
 Gabriel Romero as Previer
 Tony Amendola as Tochtli
 Rene Mujica as Venado Azul

References

External links
 
 
 
El camino de Xico on Tomatazos
El camino de Xico on Altadefinizione

2020 films
2020 animated films
2020 directorial debut films
2020s children's animated films
Ánima Estudios films
Flash animated films
Mexican animated films
Mexican children's films
2020s Spanish-language films
Animated feature films
2020s Mexican films